(Dates in italics indicate de facto continuation of office)

See below for continuation 1886 to 17 August 1960

For continuation after independence, see: Heads of State of Gabon

See also
Gabon
Heads of State of Gabon
Lists of incumbents

 
Gabon
Colonial heads